Bournemouth Borough Council was the local authority for Bournemouth in Dorset, England between 1974 and 2019. Prior to 1974 Bournemouth had been a county borough within Hampshire (being a county borough meant it was self-governing, being independent of Hampshire County Council). Under the Local Government Act 1972 Bournemouth became a non-metropolitan district within Dorset on 1 April 1974, with the same boundaries as the former county borough. On 1 April 1997 it became a unitary authority, taking over the functions previously provided for the area by Dorset County Council. In 2019 the council was abolished, merging with Christchurch and Poole to form Bournemouth, Christchurch and Poole.

Political control
The first elections to the reformed council were held in 1973, initially to act as a shadow authority prior to the new arrangements coming into force the following year. From 1973 until the council's abolition in 2019 political control of the council was held by the following parties:

Non-metropolitan district

Unitary authority

Leadership
The role of mayor was largely ceremonial at Bournemouth Borough Council. Political leadership was instead provided by the leader of the council. The leaders from 2007 until the council's abolition in 2019 were:

Council elections

Non-metropolitan district elections
1973 Bournemouth Borough Council election
1976 Bournemouth Borough Council election
1979 Bournemouth Borough Council election (New ward boundaries)
1983 Bournemouth Borough Council election
1987 Bournemouth Borough Council election
1991 Bournemouth Borough Council election

Unitary authority elections
1996 Bournemouth Borough Council election
1999 Bournemouth Borough Council election
2003 Bournemouth Borough Council election (New ward boundaries)
2007 Bournemouth Borough Council election
2011 Bournemouth Borough Council election
2015 Bournemouth Borough Council election

Borough result maps

By-election results

1999–2003

2003–2007

2007–2011

2011–2015

References

External links
Bournemouth Borough Council

 
Council elections in Dorset
Local government in Bournemouth
Politics of Bournemouth
Unitary authority elections in England